Route 416, also known as Round Harbour Road, is a short  north–south highway on the Baie Verte Peninsula of Newfoundland in the Canadian province of Newfoundland and Labrador. It connects the nearly abandoned community of Round Harbour, as well as the community of Snook's Harbour, with Route 414 (La Scie Highway) near the town of Brent's Cove. Route 416 is entirely a gravel two-lane roadway.

Route description

Route 416 begins in Round Harbour at the harbour in the centre of town. It leaves the community and winds its way northwest through hilly terrain for a few kilometres to pass through Snook's Harbour, where it makes a sharp right turn to the north at an intersection with a local road leading to downtown. The highway winds its way north through wooded areas for a few more kilometres before Route 416 comes to an end at an intersection with Route 414 just south of Brent's Cove.

Major intersections

References

416